The Beijing–Xi'an high-speed train are high-speed train services between Beijing and Xi'an, the capital of Shaanxi Province. The trains are operated by CR Beijing and CR Xi'an.

History
The high-speed train services between Beijing and Xi'an was started on 26 December 2012, when the Beijing–Zhengzhou section of the Beijing–Guangzhou–Shenzhen–Hong Kong HSR was opened.

Operations
The trains were operated on Beijing–Guangzhou–Shenzhen–Hong Kong HSR and Zhengzhou–Xi'an HSR. 

The G25/26 and G87/88 trains have fewer stops than other trains and are called as "benchmark trains".

Benchmark trains

Other services 
Beijing West → Xi'an North:

Xi'an North → Beijing West:

Note:
●: stop at the station
↓: pass the station

Rolling stocks
The services are operated by CRH380AL and CR400AF trainsets.

References

China Railway passenger services
Passenger rail transport in China
Railway services introduced in 2012